Bickella antarctica is a species of littoral free‐swimming folliculinid ciliates, first found near King George Island. It has a typical Folliculina morphology barring its absence of lorica. It is the sole species in the genus Bickella.

References

Further reading
Wilbert, Norbert. "Species composition and structure of the ciliate community in the benthos at King George Island, Antarctica." The Antarctic ecosystem of Potter Cove, King-George Island (Isla 25 de Mayo) Synopsis of research performed 1999-2006 at the Dallmann Laboratory and Jubany Station _: 141.
Azovsky, Andrey, and Yuri Mazei. "Do microbes have macroecology? Large‐scale patterns in the diversity and distribution of marine benthic ciliates."Global Ecology and Biogeography 22.2 (2013): 163-172.

External links

Ciliate genera
Heterotrichea